HD 192263 b is a gas giant planet with a mass about three quarters that of Jupiter mass. It orbits the star in a circular orbit completing one revolution in 24 days or so. It was discovered in 2000 by the Geneva Extrasolar Planet Search team. The planet was independently detected by the California and Carnegie Planet Search team.

The planet HD 192263 b is named Beirut. The name was selected in the NameExoWorlds campaign by Lebanon, during the 100th anniversary of the IAU. Beirut is the capital and largest city of Lebanon.

In 2002 the existence of the planet was questioned by G. Henry: The star was observed to have photometric brightness variations that have same period and velocities as the planet. The signal could come from those variations instead of the planet orbiting the star or suggests that rotational modulation of the visibility of stellar surface activity is the source of the observed radial velocity variations. Finally, in 2003 the planet was confirmed; the planet is thought to be causing fluctuations in the system's magnetic field, causing visible activity.

Preliminary astrometry in 2001 set its inclination at 179.5°; but it is now thought to be inclined according to the star's ecliptic, edge-on to Earth.

References
Notes

Bibliography

External links
 
  – discovery announcement
 
 
 
 

Exoplanets discovered in 1999
Giant planets
Aquila (constellation)
Exoplanets detected by radial velocity
Exoplanets with proper names